An air well may refer to:

Air well (condenser), a structure or device designed to promote the condensation of atmospheric moisture
Air well (ventilation), an architectural feature designed to promote ventilation

See also

Atmospheric water generator
Dew pond
Fog fence
Lightwell
Solar chimney
Windcatcher